Hiroden-itsukaichi is a Hiroden station on Hiroden Miyajima Line, located south of the JR Itsukaichi Station in Asahien, Saeki-ku, Hiroshima.

Routes
From Hiroden-itsukaichi Station, there is one of Hiroden Streetcar routes.
 Hiroshima Station - Hiroden-miyajima-guchi Route

Connections
█ Miyajima Line

 — Hiroden-itsukaichi — Saeki-kuyakusyo-mae (Saeki Ward Office)

Other services connections

JR lines
JR lines connections at JR Itsukaichi Station
Hiroden-itsukaichi Station is directly connected to the JR Itsukaichi Station by an overpass.

Bus services routes
Bus services routes connections at Itsukaichi Station

History
Opened as "Itsukaichi-cho" on April 6, 1924.
Renamed to "Dentei-Itsukaichi" on February 1, 1931.
Renamed to "Hiroden-itsukaichi" on June 1, 1961.
Moved to present place to connect to JR Itsukaichi Station on March 27, 1987

See also
Hiroden Streetcar Lines and Routes

References

Hiroden Miyajima Line stations
Railway stations in Japan opened in 1924